Bruno Eduardo Regufe Alves  (born 27 November 1981) is a Portuguese former footballer who played as a central defender, currently sporting director of Super League Greece club AEK Athens.

He began and spent most of his professional career at Porto, where he won a total of nine titles and appeared in 171 official games. He also won trophies in Russia with Zenit Saint Petersburg, and in Turkey with Fenerbahçe.

A senior Portugal international since 2007, Alves represented the country in three World Cups, three European Championships and one Confederations Cup, winning Euro 2016 and earning 96 caps in the process.

Club career

Porto
Alves was born in Póvoa de Varzim, and grew up in the Caxinas fishing neighbourhood of bordering Vila do Conde, as did his long-time international teammates Hélder Postiga and Fábio Coentrão. He started playing football for local club Varzim SC, before joining the youth ranks of FC Porto at the age of 17.

After three consecutive loans, two in Portugal and another in Greece with AEK Athens FC, Alves returned Porto for the 2005–06 season, extending his contract until 2010 and battling for a first-team spot with Ricardo Costa and João Paulo. He played seven league games for the eventual Primeira Liga champions, but was infamously sent off on 15 October 2005 in a 0–2 home loss against S.L. Benfica, after headbutting Nuno Gomes.

The arrival of manager Jesualdo Ferreira in summer 2006 signalled the turning point in Alves' career. He beat off stiff competition for a starting berth in the team alongside Pepe and formed a solid partnership with the Brazilian-born centre back. An impressive campaign saw the player finally come of age, and he was ever-present as the northerners won another national championship.

On 7 April 2009, Alves' early mistake in a UEFA Champions League quarter-final tie against Manchester United at Old Trafford led to Wayne Rooney's equaliser– the match ended 2–2 and Porto went on to lose 3–2 on aggregate. However, on 10 May, he headed in the only goal in a home win over C.D. Nacional which ensured team and the player a fourth consecutive league accolade.

Zenit Saint Petersburg

On 3 August 2010, aged 28, Alves signed with Russian Premier League side FC Zenit Saint Petersburg for €22 million, joining compatriots Danny and Fernando Meira in the squad. Upon his arrival, head coach Luciano Spalletti described him as a very important player for the team, noting his experience, ability in the air and strong character.

Alves scored his first goal for the side on 30 September 2010, against former team AEK Athens in the group stage of the UEFA Europa League.

Fenerbahçe

On 5 June 2013, Alves agreed to join Turkey's Fenerbahçe SK on a three-year deal worth €2.5 million per season, for a transfer fee of €5.5 million. He scored twice in 25 league appearances in his first season in Istanbul, to help the side win the Süper Lig title, and also contested in their Turkish Super Cup win against Galatasaray SK on 25 August 2014.

On 18 October 2014, Alves was given a straight red card for kicking Blerim Džemaili, as his team eventually lost 2–1 to Galatasaray at the Türk Telekom Arena. He was sent off again on 25 May 2015, for conceding a penalty against another team from the city, İstanbul Başakşehir, being the second of four Fener players to be dismissed in a 2–2 draw which gave the title to Galatasaray.

Cagliari
On 5 June 2016, Alves signed a two-year contract with Cagliari Calcio, who had recently returned to the Italian Serie A. The deal was set to go through when he became a free agent at the end of the month. He made his debut on 15 August 2016, in a 5–1 home win over S.P.A.L. 2013 in the Coppa Italia, and scored his first goal on 11 September, which was a free-kick in a 2–1 league loss at Bologna F.C. 1909.

Rangers
On 31 May 2017, Alves signed for Rangers on a two-year deal for an undisclosed fee. He scored his first goal for his new team on 9 August, in a 6–0 routing of Dunfermline Athletic in the Scottish League Cup.

On 24 October 2017, two days after an incident with Louis Moult during a 0–2 defeat against Motherwell in the League Cup semi-finals, Alves was handed a two-match ban which was appealed. On 11 July 2018, the 36-year-old terminated his contract by mutual consent.

Parma
Alves returned to the Italian top division in the summer of 2018, joining recently promoted Parma Calcio 1913 until 30 June 2019. In February 2019, he signed a new deal covering the 2019–20 season and, in January 2020, agreed to a further extension until June 2021.

On 30 May 2021, after being relegated to Serie B, Alves announced he was leaving the club.

Later years
Alves agreed to a two-year contract with F.C. Famalicão on 1 July 2021. Two weeks later, however, after falling out with the management, he cancelled it.

On 4 September 2021, Alves signed a one-year deal at Apollon Smyrnis FC; aged nearly 40, he returned to the Greek top flight and the city of Athens for the first time in 16 years. He announced his retirement in June 2022, being appointed sporting director of AEK Athens shortly after.

International career

Alves played for Portugal at the 2004 Summer Olympics, with the country's participation ending after three games in Greece. Luiz Felipe Scolari gave him his full international debut in June 2007 against Kuwait in a 1–1 away draw, and he was later selected as a back-up for UEFA Euro 2008, appearing in the 0–2 group stage loss to Switzerland.

A regular starter during the 2010 FIFA World Cup qualifiers, Alves headed the winner in injury time for the final 2–1 win in Albania on 6 June 2009, allowing Portugal to reach the play-offs; there, in the first leg in Lisbon, he also found the net (the game's only goal) against Bosnia and Herzegovina, in an eventual 2–0 aggregate qualification. He also played all the matches and minutes in the finals in South Africa, in an eventual round-of-16 exit.

Alves played all the games and minutes at the Euro 2012 tournament, starring alongside former Porto teammate Pepe. In the semi-finals, against Spain, he missed his penalty shootout attempt in a 4–2 loss.

Ten days after being included in Paulo Bento's final 23-men squad for the 2014 World Cup, Alves scored a 93rd-minute winner in a 1–0 friendly win over Mexico for his tenth international goal, also featuring in the tournament opener against Germany, a 0–4 defeat. He also started in the following two fixtures in Brazil, in a group stage exit.

Alves was also selected for Euro 2016. In the penultimate warm-up game away to England on 2 June, he was sent off in the first half for a head-high tackle on Harry Kane; he only made his debut in the tournament in the semi-finals against Wales due to injury to Pepe, playing the full 90 minutes and being booked in a 2–0 victory at the Parc Olympique Lyonnais.

In May 2017, Alves was picked for the 2017 FIFA Confederations Cup squad. The following year, he was selected for the 2018 World Cup also to be held in Russia.

Personal life
Alves' older brother, Geraldo, was also a footballer and a central defender. He had paternal Brazilian ancestry through his father Washington Geraldo Dias Alves. He played ten years of his career in Portugal–mainly with Varzim–where his children were born.

The youngest sibling, Júlio, was also a footballer, playing in the midfielder position. Their uncle, Geraldo Assoviador, also played the sport.

Career statistics

Club

International

Source:

International goals

|}

Honours

Porto
Primeira Liga: 2005–06, 2006–07, 2007–08, 2008–09
Taça de Portugal: 2005–06, 2008–09, 2009–10
Supertaça Cândido de Oliveira: 2006, 2009

Zenit Saint Petersburg
Russian Premier League: 2010, 2011–12
Russian Super Cup: 2011

Fenerbahçe
Süper Lig: 2013–14
Turkish Super Cup: 2014

Portugal U21
Toulon Tournament: 2001

Portugal B
Torneio Vale do Tejo: 2004

Portugal
UEFA European Championship: 2016
FIFA Confederations Cup third place: 2017

Individual
Primeira Liga Player of the Year: 2009
Russian Premier League Top 33 Players of the Season: 2010 (right-centre back Nº2)

Orders
 Commander of the Order of Merit

References

External links

National team data 

1981 births
Living people
People from Póvoa de Varzim
Portuguese people of Brazilian descent
Sportspeople from Porto District
Portuguese footballers
Association football defenders
Primeira Liga players
Liga Portugal 2 players
Segunda Divisão players
FC Porto B players
FC Porto players
S.C. Farense players
Vitória S.C. players
F.C. Famalicão players
Super League Greece players
AEK Athens F.C. players
Apollon Smyrnis F.C. players
Russian Premier League players
FC Zenit Saint Petersburg players
Süper Lig players
Fenerbahçe S.K. footballers
Serie A players
Cagliari Calcio players
Parma Calcio 1913 players
Scottish Professional Football League players
Rangers F.C. players
Portugal youth international footballers
Portugal under-21 international footballers
Portugal B international footballers
Portugal international footballers
Footballers at the 2004 Summer Olympics
Olympic footballers of Portugal
UEFA Euro 2008 players
2010 FIFA World Cup players
UEFA Euro 2012 players
2014 FIFA World Cup players
UEFA Euro 2016 players
2017 FIFA Confederations Cup players
2018 FIFA World Cup players
UEFA European Championship-winning players
Portuguese expatriate footballers
Expatriate footballers in Greece
Expatriate footballers in Russia
Expatriate footballers in Turkey
Expatriate footballers in Italy
Expatriate footballers in Scotland
Portuguese expatriate sportspeople in Greece
Portuguese expatriate sportspeople in Russia
Portuguese expatriate sportspeople in Turkey
Portuguese expatriate sportspeople in Italy
Portuguese expatriate sportspeople in Scotland
Commanders of the Order of Merit (Portugal)